Atieli Pakalani (born 2 August 1989) is a Tongan rugby union player. He is nicknamed the 'Tongan Hitman', and his usual position is on the wing. Pakalani played Super Rugby for the NSW Waratahs in 2011. In 2017 Pakalani joined Leicester Tigers.

Biography 
Pakalani attended secondary school at Tamaki College in New Zealand. He joined ITM Cup team Auckland in 2009 on a two-year deal. He also captained the Tongan Under 20 team at the 2009 IRB Junior World Championship.

In 2014 Pakalani represented Australia 7s at the time committing him to represent Australia only.

Pakalani competed for Tonga at the 2022 Rugby World Cup Sevens in Cape Town.

Reference list

External links
 

Tongan rugby union players
Rugby union wings
1989 births
Living people
New South Wales Waratahs players
Auckland rugby union players
Tongan emigrants to New Zealand
Tongan expatriate rugby union players
Expatriate rugby union players in Australia
Tongan expatriate sportspeople in Australia
People educated at Tamaki College
People from Tongatapu
Leicester Tigers players
Tonga international rugby union players
Peñarol Rugby players
Rugby sevens players at the 2022 Commonwealth Games